The Manicoré warbling antbird (Hypocnemis rondoni) is a species of insectivorous bird in the family Thamnophilidae. It is found in Brazil. Its natural habitat is subtropical or tropical moist lowland forests.

The Manicoré warbling antbird was first described in 2013.

References

Manicoré warbling antbird
Birds of the Amazon Basin
Manicoré warbling antbird